Barbodes ivis is a species of cyprinid fish endemic to the Philippines.

References

Endemic fauna of the Philippines
Barbodes
Fish described in 1910